Stockport is a constituency represented in the House of Commons of the UK Parliament since 2019 by Navendu Mishra of the Labour Party.

History 
Stockport was created as a two-member parliamentary borough by the Reform Act 1832. Under the Representation of the People Act 1918, the constituency was retained as one of only 12 two-member non-university seats, with the boundaries being brought into line with those of the county borough, which had expanded through absorbing the urban districts of Reddish and Heaton Norris (formerly part of the Stretford constituency), and into neighbouring parishes in the abolished constituency of Hyde.

Under the Representation of the People Act 1948, all 2-member seats were abolished and Stockport was split into the single member seats of Stockport North and Stockport South.

Following the formation of the metropolitan borough of Stockport under the Local Government Act 1972, the single Stockport seat, electing one MP, was recreated for the 1983 general election, encompassing central and southern parts of the ex-county borough, with northern parts, including Reddish, forming part of the new Denton and Reddish seat.

Boundaries 

1918-1950: The County Borough of Stockport.

1983–1997: The Metropolitan Borough of Stockport wards of Cale Green, Davenport, Edgeley, Heaton Mersey, Heaton Moor, and Manor.

1997–2010: The Metropolitan Borough of Stockport wards of Brinnington, Cale Green, Davenport, Edgeley, Heaton Mersey, Heaton Moor, and Manor.

Brinnington ward transferred from Denton and Reddish.

2010–present: The Metropolitan Borough of Stockport wards of Brinnington and Central, Davenport and Cale Green, Edgeley and Cheadle Heath, Heatons North, Heatons South, and Manor.

Boundaries adjusted to take account of revision of local authority wards.

Members of Parliament

Prominent members 
Edward William Watkin was a railway entrepreneur, who helped to fund and plan lines across Britain, in Canada and, to a lesser extent, in the USA.

George Whiteley became later in his tenure for Stockport Chief Whip between 1905 and 1908 in the Liberal administrations of Sir Henry Campbell-Bannerman and H. H. Asquith.

In the 21st century, Ann Coffey was PPS to the Chancellor of the Exchequer while this role was held by Alistair Darling.

MPs 1832–1950

MPs 1983–present
Constituency recreated (1983)

Elections

Elections in the 2010s

Ann Coffey left Labour in February 2019 and joined Change UK.

Elections in the 2000s

Elections in the 1990s

Elections in the 1980s

Elections in the 1940s

Elections in the 1930s

Elections in the 1920s

Elections in the 1910s

In 1918 Hughes was endorsed by the Coalition Government. The Coalition had a policy of not publicly endorsing Labour Party candidates but Wardle was a known supporter of the Coalition.

Elections in the 1900s

Elections in the 1890s

 Caused by Jennings' death.

Elections in the 1880s

Elections in the 1870s

Elections in the 1860s

 

 

 

 
 
 

 Caused by Kershaw's death.

Elections in the 1850s

Elections in the 1840s

 
 

 Caused by Cobden declining the seat after also being elected for West Riding of Yorkshire and opting to sit there.

Elections in the 1830s

See also
1920 Stockport by-election
1925 Stockport by-election
List of parliamentary constituencies in Greater Manchester
History of parliamentary constituencies and boundaries in Cheshire

Notes

References

Sources

Election results, 1992–2005 (Guardian)
Election results 1983–1992
John McHugh, The Stockport by-election of 1920

Parliamentary constituencies in Greater Manchester
Constituencies of the Parliament of the United Kingdom established in 1832
Constituencies of the Parliament of the United Kingdom disestablished in 1950
Constituencies of the Parliament of the United Kingdom established in 1983
Politics of the Metropolitan Borough of Stockport
Stockport